Antonio Guarco was a statesman who became doge of the Republic of Genoa. Antonio was the son of Nicolò, who had been doge from 1378 to 1383. Like his predecessors, he suffered from the conflicts between the great families of the nobility. Antoniotto Adorno finally managed to force Antonio out of office.

References

14th-century Doges of Genoa